Akça is a village in the Kızıltepe District of Mardin Province in Turkey. The village is populated by Kurdish-speaking Arabs who are of the Erbanî tribe. The villagers are of Tayy descent. The village had a population of 383 in 2021.

References 

Villages in Kızıltepe District
Kurdish settlements in Mardin Province
Arab settlements in Mardin Province